Multidentorhodacarus is a genus of mites in the family Rhodacaridae. There are about 16 described species in Multidentorhodacarus.

Species
These 16 species belong to the genus Multidentorhodacarus:

 Multidentorhodacarus ananasi (Ryke, 1962)
 Multidentorhodacarus angustacuminis (Karg, 1998)
 Multidentorhodacarus brevicuspidis Karg, 2000
 Multidentorhodacarus brevisetosus Karg, 2000
 Multidentorhodacarus denticulatus (Berlese, 1920)
 Multidentorhodacarus differentis Karg & Schorlemmer, 2009
 Multidentorhodacarus minutocorpus (Karg, 1998)
 Multidentorhodacarus paulista Castilho & Moraes, 2010
 Multidentorhodacarus pennacornutus Karg, 2000
 Multidentorhodacarus ruwenzoriensis (Loots, 1969)
 Multidentorhodacarus sogdianus (Shcherbak, 1980)
 Multidentorhodacarus squamosus Karg, 2000
 Multidentorhodacarus sublapideus (Ryke, 1962)
 Multidentorhodacarus tertius (Karg, 1996)
 Multidentorhodacarus thysi (Jordaan, Loots & Theron, 1988)
 Multidentorhodacarus triramulus (Karg, 1998)

References

Acari